Nu'man or Nu'maan is an Arabic given name dating to pre-Islamic times, meaning blood or red.

Prevailingly, the Islamic given name is most commonly associated to the Arabic word meaning bliss. It is also used with the definite article, transliterated an-Nu'man or al-Nu'man. Alternatives spellings include Noman, Nouman, Noumaan, and Numan.It may refer to:

seven of the Ghassanid Kings (327-ca. 600)
Al-Nu'man I ibn Imru' al-Qays (reigned ca. 390–418), king of the Lakhmids
Al-Nu'man II ibn al-Aswad (reigned 497–503), king of the Lakhmids
Al-Nu'man VI ibn al-Mundhir (active 581-583), king of the Ghassanids
Al-Nu'man III ibn al-Mundhir (active (582–ca. 602), king of the Lakhmids
Nouman ibn Muqarrin (died 641), one of the companions of Muhammad
Nuʿmān ibn Thābit ibn Zuṭā ibn Marzubān, known as Abū Ḥanīfa (699—767), founder of the Sunni Hanafi school of Islamic jurisprudence
Qadi al-Nu'man (died 974), Isma'ili jurist, official historian of the Fatimid caliphs
Köprülü Numan Pasha (died 1719), Grand Vizier of the Ottoman Empire
Noman Çelebicihan (1885-1918), Crimean Tatar politician
Ahmad Muhammad Numan (1909-1996), twice Prime Minister of the Yemen Arab Republic
Yasin Said Numan, Prime Minister of the People's Democratic Republic of Yemen, 1986-1990
Numan Gumaa (born 1937) Egyptian lawyer and politician
Mohamed Noman Galal (born 1943), Egyptian diplomat and author
Numan Kurtulmuş (born 1959), Turkish politician
Noman Mubashir (born 1974), Pakistani-Norwegian journalist
Noman Bashir, Pakistani admiral
Nomanul Haq, Pakistani-American historian
Marwan Abdullah Abdulwahab Noman, Yemeni diplomat
No'man Ashour, Egyptian poet and playwright
Noman Benotman, Libyan politician
Noman Masood, Pakistani television actor
Noman Ijaz, Pakistani television and film actor
Nouman Ali Khan, Pakistani-American Muslim speaker

See also
Nuaman, name of a Palestinian hamlet outside Jerusalem.
Numan (disambiguation), another spelling of the name
Ma`arrat an-Nu`man, city in Syria
Naaman (disambiguation)
Nomani

Arabic masculine given names
Pakistani masculine given names